Bindoo is a townland in the civil parish of Kildrumsherdan in County Cavan, Ireland. Evidence of ancient settlement in the townland includes a ringfort (rath) site.

The townland, located close to Cootehill, is home to a wind farm which was erected in 2007. It was developed and operated by Airtricity and, as of mid-2007, was the "second largest Airtricity wind farm" in Ireland. The wind farm has 32 GE 1.5 MW Wind Turbines with a 65-metre hub height and 70 metre rotor diameter giving a total capacity of 48 megawatts.

References

Townlands of County Cavan